Joseph Connolly (born March 23 1950) is an English journalist, novelist, and non-fiction writer.

Biography
For many years he owned The Flask Bookshop in Hampstead, London. Having started writing fiction rather late in life, he is best known today for comic novels, especially in France, where they have been translated by Alain Defossé. He also contributes to The Times and other publications.  

His son is Charles Connolly, a musician. The two live in Hampstead.

Work

Novels

Poor Souls (1985)
This Is It (1996)
Stuff (1997)
Summer Things (1998) (filmed in France in 2002 by Michel Blanc as Embrassez qui vous voudrez starring Charlotte Rampling, Jacques Dutronc and Carole Bouquet)
Winter Breaks (1999)
It Can't Go On (2001)
S.O.S. (2001)
The Works (2003)
Love Is Strange (2005)
Jack the Lad and Bloody Mary (2007)
England's Lane (2012)
Boys and Girls (2014)
Style (2015)
This is 64 (2016)

Most of his novels were published by Faber and Faber.  England's Lane, Boys and Girls, Style, and This is 64 were published by Quercus.

Non-fiction
Collecting Modern First Editions (1975) (a standard work on book collecting)
Modern First Editions: Their Value to Collectors (1984)
Children's Modern First Editions: Their Value to Collectors (1988)
P.G. Wodehouse (1979) (biography)
Jerome K. Jerome (1982) (biography)
Beside the Seaside (1999)
All Shook Up: A Flash of the Fifties (2000)
Christmas And How to Survive It: Laughter Matters (2003)
Eighty Years of Book Cover Design (2008)
The A-Z of Eating Out (2014)

References

External links
Official JosephConnolly.co.uk, official website

Forces.org,  "Sharing an Ashtray with ... Joseph Connolly" (interview)
Hasweb.org, The Hampstead Authors' Society
Thecnj.com, A review of Love Is Strange from the Camden New Journal (includes author photograph)
Findarticles.com, Joseph Connolly on Kingsley Amis (The Independent, 20 August 2005)

Ham and High Charles Connolly in the Hampstead High.

1950 births
Living people
People from Hampstead
20th-century English novelists
21st-century English novelists
English male journalists
English male novelists
20th-century English male writers
21st-century English male writers